NGC 4637 is a lenticular galaxy located in the Virgo constellation, originally discovered by  R.J. Mitchell on March 1, 1854. It is a member of the Virgo Cluster, and is located in the sky very close to the brighter and larger galaxy NGC 4638, which historically led to some confusion upon discovery and later observations.

See also
New General Catalogue
NGC 4638

References 

4637
Lenticular galaxies
Virgo (constellation)